Line judge can refer to the following:

Line judge (tennis), an official in tennis to observe the passage of tennis balls over the boundary lines of the court
Electronic line judge, an electronic system used in tennis to automatically detect where a ball has landed on the court
Line judge (gridiron football), an official in gridiron football responsible for the line of scrimmage and sideline fouls